Eucosma matutina is a species of moth of the family Tortricidae. It is found in the United States, where it has been recorded from Alabama, Colorado, Illinois, Indiana, Iowa, Kansas, Kentucky, Maine, Massachusetts, Michigan, Minnesota, Mississippi, Montana, New Mexico, Ohio, Oklahoma, Ontario, Texas, Utah, Vermont and Wisconsin.

The wingspan is about 16.5 mm. The forewings have a distinct black-and-white pattern. Adults have been recorded on wing from May to September and are attracted to light.

References

External links 
 tortricidae.com
 Eucosma at BugGuide.Net

Eucosmini
Moths described in 1873